Graeme Smith (born 1981) is a South African cricketer.

Graeme Smith may also refer to:

 Graeme Smith (footballer, born 1982), Scottish football goalkeeper for Peterhead F.C.
 Graeme Smith (footballer, born 1983), Scottish football goalkeeper for Brechin City F.C.
 Graeme Smith (swimmer) (born 1976), Scottish Olympic swimmer
 Graeme Smith (journalist) (born 1979), Canadian journalist
 Graeme Smith (radio presenter) (born 1983), British born TV and radio presenter
 Graeme N. Smith, Canadian obstetrician

See also
 Graham Smith (disambiguation)